Amanda Montell (born 16 February 1992) is an American author, linguist, and writer.

Life and career
Montell was born and raised in Baltimore, Maryland. Her debut book, Wordslut: A Feminist Guide to Taking Back the English Language, was released in 2019 and received positive reviews from critics. It was named one of the best books of May 2019 by Popsugar, Marie Claire, and Cosmopolitan. 

Her second book, Cultish: The Language of Fanaticism, was published in 2021 and also received positive reviews from critics. The book was partially inspired by Montell's father, who spent his teen years in the cult Synanon. Montell is also a cohost of the weekly podcast Sounds Like a Cult with documentarian Isabela Medina-Maté, where they examine groups from across the cultural zeitgeist.

Montell holds a degree in linguistics from New York University and her writing has appeared in Time, Nylon, Cosmopolitan, Glamour, Domino, and Marie Claire. She previously worked as a beauty and features editor at Byrdie and Who What Wear. She also created a web series, The Dirty Word, for Joey Soloway's now defunct platform, Wifey.

References

External links
Official Website

American women non-fiction writers
21st-century American women writers
American feminist writers
New York University alumni
21st-century American non-fiction writers
1992 births
Living people